Bearwallow Run is a tributary of Shingle Mill Run in Sullivan County, Pennsylvania, in the United States. The stream is considered to be Class B Wild Trout Waters and wild trout reproduce naturally within it. The surficial geology in the area mainly consists of bedrock and Boulder Colluvium.

Course
Bearwallow Run begins in a valley on Huckleberry Mountain in Davidson Township. It flows northeast for several hundred feet before turning east for a short distance. It then turns east-northeast for several tenths of a mile before receiving an unnamed tributary from the right. It then turns northeast. Several tenths of a mile further downstream, the stream reaches its confluence with Shingle Mill Run.

Geography and geology

The surficial geology in the vicinity of Bearwallow Run mostly consists of bedrock containing sandstone and shale, especially on the valley slopes and plateaus. However, some Boulder Colluvium is also present along the stream. Boulder Colluvium contains numerous boulders made of quartz, sandstone, or conglomerate. The surficial geology in the upper reaches of the stream is much the same, with Boulder Colluvium on the valley floors and bedrock elsewhere.

Watershed
Its mouth of in the United States Geological Survey quadrangle of Elk Grove. However, its source is in the quadrangle of Sonestown.

The watershed of Bearwallow Run is in the vicinity of the North Mountain region. The stream is in the southwestern part of Pennsylvania State Game Lands Number 13.

History
Bearwallow Run was entered into the Geographic Names Information System on August 2, 1979. Its identifier in the Geographic Names Information System is 1192106.

There were plans to make the area in the vicinity of Bearwallow Run part of Pennsylvania State Game Lands Number 13 as early as 1930.

Biology
Wild trout naturally reproduce in Bearwallow Run from its headwaters downstream to its mouth. The entire length of the stream is considered by the Pennsylvania Fish and Boat Commission to be Class B Wild Trout Waters.

See also
List of tributaries of Fishing Creek (North Branch Susquehanna River)
List of rivers of Pennsylvania

References

Rivers of Sullivan County, Pennsylvania
Tributaries of Fishing Creek (North Branch Susquehanna River)
Rivers of Pennsylvania